Golden Palace can refer to:

 The Golden Palace, a TV sitcom spin-off of The Golden Girls
 GoldenPalace.com, an Internet-based casino known for paying boxers to get tattoos of their website on their bodies
 Domus Aurea (Latin for "Golden House"), a large palace built by the Roman emperor Nero
 Golden Palace Hotel, in Tsaghkadzor, Armenia
 Radisson Blu Hotel, Yerevan, previously named Golden Palace Yerevan, in Armenia

See also
 
 Palace of Gold (disambiguation)
 Golden House (disambiguation)